This is a list of notable YWCA buildings.  YWCA buildings are prominent in many cities.

Australia
Grand Central Hotel, a.k.a. Grand Central YWCA, Grand Hotel, Grand Central Coffee Palace, at 379 Wellington St. in Perth, Western Australia, Western Australia State Heritage-listed

Canada 

 Y des Femmes de Montréal (YWCA Montreal), (Montréal, Québec, Canada). Built in 1875, moved to its current building on 1355 Boulevard René-Lévesque West in 1952.

Great Britain
Ames House, 44 Mortimer Street, Camden borough of London, built in 1904, designed by Beresford Pite, the first "major" YWCA building of the YWCA in London, which had operated from 1857, a Heritage site.
Queen Mary Hall and YWCA Central Club, a Grade II listed building, built during 1928-32, designed by Sir Edwin Lutyens, on Great Russell Street, also in Camden borough of London.

New Zealand
YWCA building, 268 Madras St., Christchurch.  Built in 1914.  A category 2 historic place (#1951).  Demolished in 2011.

United States
In the United States, many are listed on the U.S. National Register of Historic Places (NRHP).  A 1997 article covered all the YWCA buildings listed at that time.

(by state then city)
Hollywood Studio Club, Hollywood, Los Angeles, California, NRHP-listed
Oakland YWCA Building, Oakland, California, listed on the NRHP in Alameda County, California
Old YWCA Building (Riverside, California), listed on the NRHP in Riverside County, California
Young Women's Christian Association (Pueblo, Colorado), listed on the NRHP in Pueblo County, Colorado
Young Women's Christian Association Complex, Athens, Georgia, listed on the NRHP in Clarke County, Georgia

YWCA Building (Honolulu, Hawaii), a building in Downtown Honolulu that was built in 1927.  It was designed by Julia Morgan including Beaux-Arts and Mediterranean Revival stylings.
YWCA Building (Peoria, Illinois), listed on the NRHP in Peoria County, Illinois
Young Women's Christian Association (Elkhart, Indiana), listed on the NRHP in Elkhart County, Indiana
YWCA (5th St., Evansville, Indiana), listed on the National Register of Historic Places in Vanderburgh County, Indiana
YWCA (Vine St., Evansville, Indiana), listed on the National Register of Historic Places in Vanderburgh County, Indiana
YWCA (Muncie, Indiana), listed on the National Register of Historic Places in Delaware County, Indiana
YWCA Blue Triangle Residence Hall, Indianapolis, Indiana, listed on the NRHP in Center Township, Marion County, Indiana
Keokuk Young Women's Christian Association Building, Keokuk, Iowa, listed on the NRHP in Lee County, Iowa
Ottumwa Young Women's Christian Association, Ottumwa, Iowa, listed on the NRHP in Wapello County, Iowa
YWCA Boston building (Clarendon Street), Boston, Massachusetts, listed on the NRHP in Boston, Massachusetts.  Landmark building of the YWCA Boston organization.
YWCA of Duluth, Duluth, Minnesota, listed on the NRHP in St. Louis County, Minnesota.
YWCA, Phillis Wheatley Branch, St. Louis, Missouri, listed on the NRHP in St. Louis, Missouri
Young Women's Christian Association (Independent), Helena, Montana, listed on the NRHP in Lewis and Clark County, Montana
Lincoln YWCA Building, Lincoln, Nebraska, listed on the NRHP in Lancaster County, Nebraska
Young Women's Christian Association of Central New Jersey (formerly the YWCA of Plainfield and North Plainfield), Plainfield, New Jersey, listed on the NRHP in Union County, New Jersey
 Young Women's Christian Association (Akron, Ohio), listed on the NRHP in Akron, Ohio
Young Women's Christian Association of Cincinnati, listed on the NRHP in Cincinnati, Ohio
Griswold Memorial Young Women's Christian Association, Columbus, Ohio, listed on the NRHP in Columbus, Ohio
YWCA Youngstown, Youngstown, Ohio, listed on the NRHP in Mahoning County, Ohio
Zanesville YWCA, Zanesville, Ohio, listed on the NRHP in Muskingum County, Ohio
Kensington Branch of the Philadelphia YWCA, Philadelphia, Pennsylvania, listed on the NRHP in North Philadelphia, Pennsylvania

Young Women's Christian Association Building (Nashville, Tennessee), listed on the NRHP in Davidson County, Tennessee
Fort Worth Elks Lodge 124, Fort Worth, Texas, also known as YWCA of Fort Worth, NRHP-listed
Young Women's Christian Association (Richmond, Virginia), listed on the NRHP in Richmond, Virginia
Young Women's Christian Association (Bellingham, Washington), listed on the NRHP in Whatcom County, Washington
YWCA Building (Seattle), Seattle, Washington, listed on the NRHP in King County, Washington
Young Women's Christian Association Building (Yakima, Washington), Yakima, Washington listed on the NRHP in Yakima County, Washington
Phillis Wheatley YWCA, Washington, D.C., listed on the NRHP in Northwest Quadrant, Washington, D.C.
Lovejoy Manor, Janesville, Wisconsin, listed on the NRHP in Rock County, Wisconsin

Related places
Related places include:
Barbizon Hotel for Women, New York City
Young Men’s and Young Women’s Hebrew Association Building, Baltimore, Maryland

See also
 YWCA
 YWCA USA
Young Men's and Young Women's Hebrew Association Building, Baltimore, Maryland, listed on the NRHP in Baltimore, Maryland
List of YMCA buildings
List of women's club buildings

References

 
Lists of buildings and structures
Women-only spaces